The canton of Val d'Ariège is an administrative division of the Ariège department, southern France. It was created at the French canton reorganisation which came into effect in March 2015. Its seat is in Varilhes.

It consists of the following communes:
 
Arabaux
Baulou
Bénac
Le Bosc
Brassac
Burret
Calzan
Cazaux
Coussa
Crampagna
Dalou
Gudas
L'Herm
Loubens
Loubières
Malléon
Montégut-Plantaurel
Pradières
Saint-Félix-de-Rieutord
Saint-Jean-de-Verges
Saint-Martin-de-Caralp
Ségura
Serres-sur-Arget
Varilhes
Ventenac
Vernajoul
Verniolle
Vira

References

Cantons of Ariège (department)